Shuey is a surname. Notable people with the surname include:
Audrey M. Shuey (1910–1977), American psychologist and writer
Bill Shuey (1974), American football coach and former defensive back
Juniper Shuey (1974), American visual artist
Luke Shuey (1990), Australian rules footballer
Michael Shuey (1994), American track and field athlete
Paul Shuey (1970), American former professional baseball player

English toponymic surnames